Eloy Maximiliano Pereira (born 4 March 1993) is an Argentine professional footballer who plays as a centre-back.

Club career
Pereira began in the youth ranks of Belgrano de Lanús. He then moved to Lanús' academy, prior to signing for Talleres' system; he subsequently left to join Banfield, but returned to Talleres soon after. His senior career got underway in 2014. Thirty-one appearances followed in two seasons in Primera C Metropolitana, with Talleres winning promotion in 2015. His first appearance in Primera B Metropolitana followed on 5 February 2016 versus Platense, with his first goal then coming in the succeeding May against Villa San Carlos. A total of eighty-five appearances came across five campaigns, fourteen of which arrived in 2017–18.

On 17 August 2018, Pereira moved to fellow third tier team Deportivo Español. He made his debut on 20 August in a loss to ex-club Talleres. He appeared eight more times in 2018–19 as they were relegated, with the centre-back being released soon after.

International career
Pereira previously received a call-up to train with Walter Perazzo's Argentina U20s.

Career statistics
.

References

External links

1993 births
Living people
Sportspeople from Lanús
Argentine footballers
Association football defenders
Primera C Metropolitana players
Primera B Metropolitana players
Talleres de Remedios de Escalada footballers
Deportivo Español footballers